List of lists of issues and controversies with the law

 Legal issues in airsoft
 Legal issues with fan fiction
 Burger King legal issues
 Legal issues and controversies surrounding Netflix
 Legality of cannabis
 Legal issues surrounding music sampling
 Legal issues related to the September 11 attacks
 Legal aspects of file sharing

Law-related lists